The 1983–84 New York Islanders season was the 12th season for the franchise in the National Hockey League. The Islanders entered to the season as the four-time defending Stanley Cup champions, and subsequently went the Stanley Cup Finals for the fifth time in a row, but lost four games to one in a rematch against the Edmonton Oilers.

The Islanders nevertheless set a new North American major professional sports record by winning nineteen consecutive playoff series (two more than the seventeen series won by the Boston Celtics in their eight year NBA championship dynasty) and unmatched in any major sport since.

Offseason

NHL Draft

Regular season

All Star Game 
The 35th National Hockey League All-Star Game was held at Nassau Veterans Memorial Coliseum. The Campbell Conference defeated the Wales Conference 9–3. Denis Potvin, Bryan Trottier, Mike Bossy, and head coach Al Arbour participated in the All-Star Game as representatives of the Wales Conference.

Season standings

Schedule and results

Player statistics

Note: Pos = Position; GP = Games played; G = Goals; A = Assists; Pts = Points; +/- = plus/minus; PIM = Penalty minutes; PPG = Power-play goals; SHG = Short-handed goals; GWG = Game-winning goals
      MIN = Minutes played; W = Wins; L = Losses; T = Ties; GA = Goals-against; GAA = Goals-against average; SO = Shutouts;

Playoffs

Stanley Cup Finals

New York Islanders vs. Edmonton Oilers

Edmonton wins the series 4–1.

Awards and records
 Prince of Wales Trophy
 Lady Byng Memorial Trophy: Mike Bossy
 Mike Bossy, Right Wing, NHL First All-Star Team
 Denis Potvin, Defence, NHL Second All-Star Team
 Bryan Trottier, Center, NHL Second All-Star Team

References
 Islanders on Hockey Database

New York Islanders seasons
New York Islanders
New York Islanders
New York Islanders
New York Islanders
New York Islanders
Eastern Conference (NHL) championship seasons
Patrick Division champion seasons